Rémy Pagani (born 21 April 1954) is a Swiss politician. He is a member of À gauche toute! Genève and served as the mayor of Geneva from 1 June 2009 to 3 May 2010. Pagani served as mayor of Geneva for a second time from 1 June 2012 to 31 May 2013.

Biography
Pagani was born on 21 April 1954 in Geneva.

See also
 Politics of Switzerland

References

External links
 Rémy Pagani — ville-geneve.ch

Living people
1954 births
Mayors of Geneva